Osbourne is a name that is a variant of Osborne.

Notable people with the name include:

Surname
 Glen Osbourne, (born 1971), American professional wrestler
 Ida Elizabeth Osbourne (1916–2014), Australian actor and broadcaster
 Isaac Osbourne (born 1986), English footballer
 Isaiah Osbourne (born 1987), English footballer
 Isobel Osbourne (1858–1953), Robert Louis Stevenson's step-daughter and sister of Lloyd Osbourne
 Joey Osbourne, American musician
 Johnny Osbourne (born 1948), Jamaican reggae and dancehall singer in the late 1970s and mid-1980s
 Lloyd Osbourne (1868–1947), American novelist
 Ozzy Osbourne (born 1948), British singer
 Sharon Osbourne (born 1952), British TV personality and wife of Ozzy Osbourne
 Aimee Osbourne (born 1983), British model, daughter of Ozzy Osbourne
 Kelly Osbourne (born 1984), British singer, daughter of Ozzy Osbourne
 Jack Osbourne (born 1985), British son of Ozzy Osbourne
 Tom Osbourne (born 1960), American football coach

Given name
 Osbourne Fleming (born 1940), Anguillian politician
 Osbourne Moxey (born 1978),  Bahamian long jumper

Fictional characters
 Alex 'Star-Burns' Osbourne, character from Community
 Daniel Osbourne (Coronation Street)
 Daniel 'Oz' Osbourne, character in the Buffy the Vampire Slayer television series
 Denise Osbourne, character from Coronation Street

Patronymic surnames